

Seeds

  Wang Liqin (champion)
  Ma Lin (final)
  Wang Hao (fourth round)
  Vladimir Samsonov (fourth round)
  Timo Boll (fourth round)
  Ryu Seung-min (second round)
  Chen Qi (quarterfinals)
  Chuang Chih-yuan (second round)
  Werner Schlager (second round)
  Kalinikos Kreanga (fourth round)
  Jean-Michel Saive (second round)
  Kong Linghui (fourth round)
  Adrian Crișan (second round)
  Chen Weixing (second round)
  Alexey Smirnov (third round)
  Chiang Peng-lung (second round)
  Petr Korbel (third round)
  Liu Guozheng (quarterfinals)
  Michael Maze (semifinals)
  Leung Chu Yan (second round)
  Jan-Ove Waldner (third round)
  Peter Karlsson (quarterfinals)
  Zoran Primorac (first round)
  Oh Sang-eun (semifinals)
  Ko Lai Chak (second round)
  Trinko Keen (third round)
  Hao Shuai (quarterfinals)
  Lucjan Błaszczyk (fourth round)
  Fedor Kuzmin (first round)
  Cheung Yuk (third round)
  Jörg Roßkopf (third round)
  Patrick Chila (first round)

Finals

Main draw

Top half

Section 1

Section 2

Section 3

Section 4

Bottom half

Section 5

Section 6

Section 7

Section 8

References

External links
 Players' matches. ITTF.
 WM 2005 Shanghai (China). tt-wiki.info (in German).

2005 World Table Tennis Championships